The Cenél nEógain or Kinel-Owen ('Kindred of Owen') are a branch of the Northern Uí Néill, who claim descent from Eógan mac Néill, son of Niall of the Nine Hostages. Originally their power-base was in Inishowen, with their capital at Ailech, in modern-day County Donegal in what is now the west of Ulster. Under pressure from the Cenél Conaill, they gradually spread their influence eastwards into modern counties Tyrone and Derry, pushing aside the Cruithin east of the River Bann, and encroaching on the Airgiallan tribes west of Lough Neagh. By the 11th century their power-base had moved from Ailech to Tullyhogue outside Cookstown, County Tyrone. By the 12th century the Cenél Conaill conquered Inishowen; however, it mattered little to the Cenél nEóghain as they had established a powerful over-kingdom in the east that had become known as Tír Eoghain, or the "Land of Owen", preserved in the modern-day name of County Tyrone.

At their greatest they held land spanning much of County Tyrone, as well as parts of counties Londonderry, Donegal, Fermanagh, Monaghan, and Armagh.

Below is a list of their principle clans and septs.

Clann Néill (also Clan Neill)
The name O'Neill may come from Niall Glúndub, however the Clann Néill (more commonly known as Clan Neill) takes its name from his grandfather Néill Caille. The O'Neills and MacLaughlins who descend from this branch, were the two principal and most powerful septs of the Cenél nEógain, however the MacLaughlins defeat at the hands of the O'Neills in 1241 led to the O'Neills dominance over the Cenél nEógain.

Clann Aodha Bhuidhe
The Clann Aodha Bhuidhe, or Clandeboye O'Neill, is a branch of Clann Néill, descended from Aodh Meth (Hugh the Fat), King of Ulster from 1196 to 1230; Aodh Medh's  brother was Niall Ruadh (Red Niall), King of Ulster for a month after his death, and Prince of Tyrone. The eponym of the clan was  Aodh Buidhe (Yellow Hugh) O'Neill (1260–83), grandson of Aodh Meth, and last King to be called King of Ailech;  Aodh Buidhe was most notable for his close co-operation with the Earldom of Ulster. The Clandeboye O'Neills would later take control over most of eastern Ulster with the collapse of the Earldom of Ulster due to the invasion of Edward Bruce, whom they had opposed. Henry O'Neill of this line was King of Ulster from 1325 to 1344; Art O'Neill from 1509 to 1514.

Clann Domnaill
The Clann Domnaill (Clan Donnell) originated in County Donegal however moved eastwards into what is now County Tyrone. The clan is reputedly descend from Domnaill mac Áed, son of Áed Findliath and Gormlaith Rapach, daughter of Muiredach mac Echdach, King of Ulster.

Clann Birnn
The Clann Birnn is descended from Bern mac Ruadrí mac Murchad mac Máel Dúin mac Áeda Alláin. This clan resided in Muintir Birn (in barony of Dungannon) and Tellach Ainbhith (in barony of Strabane) both in modern-day County Tyrone.

Cenél Feargusa
The Cenél Feargusa (kindred of Fergus) are descended from Fergus, the son of Owen, who was the son Niall of the Nine Hostages. It is sometimes also known as the Cenél Coelbad as the descended septs are through his son Coelbad. The clan originally resided in Inishowen, County Donegal before battling their way towards Tullyhogue, County Tyrone where they became masters of Tyrone and the vanguard of the O'Neills. They advanced into Tyrone after the Cenél mBinnigh had already led the way.

Cenél mBinnigh
The Cenél mBinnigh are descended from Eochu Binneach, son of Eógan. The Cenél mBinnigh where the first clan of the Cenél nEóghain to advance from Inishowen, bypassing the fierce resistance of the Ciannachta (northern County Londonderry) and into western Airgialla (modern-day County Tyrone), and in doing so ousted several Airgiallan clans (Ui Tuirtri and FIr Li) to east of the River Bann.

From the Cenél mBinnigh came the following branches:

 Cenél mBinnig Glinne in the valley of Glenconkeine, barony of Loughinsholin, County Londonderry
 Cenél mBindigh Locha Droichid east of Magh Ith in County Tyrone
 Cenél mBindigh Tuaithe Rois eas of the river Foyle in County Londonderry and north of the barony of Loughinsholin

Cenél Moain
The Cenél Moen (old Irish: Cineal Moain) are descended from Moain, son of Muiredach, son of Eógan, son of Niall of the Nine Hostages. In the 14th century, the clan was forced across the River Foyle by the O'Donnells to northeast and east Strabane, County Tyrone.

Cenél Fearadhaigh
The Cenél Fearadhaigh, or 'kindred of Ferry', descend from Feradach mac Muiredach (Ferry MacMurdoch), a grandson of Eógan, and by the 12th century controlled a large portion of County Tyrone and had penetrated deep into County Fermanagh. By the mid-14th century, the Maguires would break the power of the Cenél Fearadhaigh in Fermanagh. Note: 
Fearadhaigh was spelt as Feradaig in Old Irish (c700-c900) and Middle Irish Gaelic (c900-c1200). 
Feradach means 'Woodsman' from fear 'man' and fiodh 'wood' combined into Fer-fedach, Fer-fid (Ferid), 'man-wood.'  and -ach 'belonging to, involved with or having'

Cenél Tigernaich
The Cenél Tigernaich, or race of Tierney, descend from Tigernach mac Muiredach, grandson of Eógan, however the Book of Ballymote states Tigernach as his son.

Cenél Mac Earca

The Cenél Mac Earca, or kindred of McErca descend from Muircherdaich, a grandson of Eógain, who was also called Mac Earca after his mother. This branch would produce a line of kings that were styled as sovereigns of Ireland. A Máel Fithrich, son of Áeda Uaridnaich, was styled as being the chief of this branch, and his death at the hands of the Cenél Fearadhaigh saw this branch end up in the barony of Clogher, County Tyrone.

Clann Conchúir Magh Ithe

The Clann Conchúir Magh Ithe, or Clan Connor, originally hailed from Magh Ithe in County Donegal before moving into County Londonderry, ruling a region that became known as O'Cahan Country. This clan descend from Connor Mac Fergal, who in turn is descended from Muirceartach Mac Earca founder of the Cenél Mic Earca.

Clan Diarmatta (also Clandermot)
The Clann Diarmatta, or Clandermot, descend from the Clann Conchúir Magh Ithe. The parish of Clondermot in County Londonderry is said to derive its name from this clan's territory.

O'Cahan of the Route
The O'Cahan's of the Route are a branch of the Ó Cathaín that moved into the area of north-eastern County Londonderry and north-western County Antrim known historically as "the Route". The Route was held by the Hiberno-Norman MacQuillans, and a fierce rivalry would erupt between the O'Cahans and MacQuillans. The end of this rivalry would see the destruction of the MacQuillans power and the weakening of the O'Cahans corresponding to the rise of MacDonnells.

The Scottish clans Both Chanain (Buchanan, Mawhinney) and Mac Ausaláin (MacCausland) both descend from Ausalan Buoy O'Kayn, allegedly of the O'Cahans of the Route.

Cenél Aenghusa
The Cenél Aenghusa, or 'kindred of Angus', are only mentioned as being of the Cenél nEóghain by a citation in the Annals, with a similar reference in the Book of Lecan.

Other Septs

See also
Northern Uí Néill
Branches of the Cenél Conaill
Ailech
O'Neill dynasty

Bibliography
Robert Bell (1988) . "The Book of Ulster Surnames", The Black Staff Press

Notes

References

External links
Annals of the kingdom of Ireland, p. 186
Annals of the kingdom of Ireland, p. 582

Connachta
Uí Néill
Gaels